The Louis Marchetti House is located in Wausau, Wisconsin, United States. It was added to the National Register of Historic Places in 1996.

History
The house belonged to Louis Marchetti, a native of Vienna, Austria who moved to Wausau in 1867. Marchetti began working in sawmills and floating lumber down the Wisconsin, but soon mastered English and would become a prominent judge and Mayor of Wausau.

References

Austrian-American history
Houses in Marathon County, Wisconsin
Houses completed in 1878
Houses on the National Register of Historic Places in Wisconsin
Second Empire architecture in Wisconsin
National Register of Historic Places in Marathon County, Wisconsin